George Sutherland (1 October 1855 – 1 December 1905), was a Scottish-born Australian journalist and writer.

He was taken to Sydney, New South Wales in 1864 with his family where he attended Sydney Grammar School. They moved to Melbourne in 1870 and he continued school at Scotch College. He graduated from the University of Melbourne in 1877. After teaching for some time he took up journalism and worked for the South Australian Register from 1881 to 1902, after which he joined the Melbourne Age.

His published works include:

 The History of Australia (1877) (with his brother Alexander Sutherland.
 Tales of the Goldfields (1880)
 Australia: Or, England in the South (1886)
 The south Australian Company (1898)
 Twentieth Century Inventions (1901)

Other works related to vinegrowing and livestock handling.

Family
His siblings included the educator Alexander Sutherland, the painter Jane Sutherland, and the physicist William Sutherland.  He was the father of the composer Margaret Sutherland.

References

 The Oxford Companion to Australian Literature, second edition, 1994, Oxford University Press.

External links
 
 
 

1855 births
1905 deaths
Scottish emigrants to colonial Australia
Journalists from Melbourne
People educated at Sydney Grammar School
People educated at Scotch College, Melbourne
University of Melbourne alumni